Society of Friends of Science in Wilno was a Polish scientific society which functioned in Wilno (since 1945 Vilnius) from 1906 to 1939. The Society was involved with the reopening of the Stefan Batory University in Wilno. One of its presidents was Marian Zdziechowski, a popular figure in the pre-World War II Wilno.

The Society was destroyed during World War II by the Lithuanian and Nazi occupying authorities.

Polish educational societies
Scientific societies based in Poland
Organizations based in Vilnius
History of Vilnius
Organizations established in 1907
Organizations disestablished in 1939
1907 establishments in the Russian Empire